Báthory is a surname of Hungarian origin that is also common in Poland and Slovakia.

Hungarian nobility 

Báthory, a Hungarian noble family of the Gutkeled clan
Stephen III Báthory (died 1444), Palatine of Hungary
Stephen V Báthory (died 1493), Voivod of Transylvania
Stephen VII Báthory (died 1530), Hungarian commander, Palatine of Hungary
Stephen VIII Báthory (1477-1534), Voivod of Transylvania
Christopher Báthory (1530-1581), administered Transylvania as voivod during the absence of his brother
Stephen Báthory of Poland (1533-1586), Voivod (and later Prince) of Transylvania and King of Poland/Grand Duke of Lithuania
Andrew Báthory (1562 or 1566–1599), cousin of Sigismund, Prince of Transylvania, Grand Master of the Order of the Dragon
Sigismund Báthory (1572-1613), son of Christopher, Prince of Transylvania
Gabriel Báthory (1589-1613), nephew of Andrew, Prince of Transylvania. 
Elizabeth Báthory (died 1614), infamous as the "Blood Countess", one of the first known serial killers

Others 

Júlia Báthory (1901 - 2000), Hungarian glass designer
Dennis Báthory-Kitsz (born 1949), Hungarian-American author and composer
Zoltan Bathory, founder and songwriter for heavy metal band Five Finger Death Punch

See also
Bathory (disambiguation)

Surnames
Surnames of Hungarian origin